Phanidhar Talukdar is an Indian politician from Assam. He was elected in Assam Legislative Assembly from Bhabanipur in the 2021 Assam Legislative Assembly election as a member of the All India United Democratic Front. On 31 August 2021, he resigned from All India United Democratic Front and joined the BJP on 1 September 2021.

References

Assam politicians
Living people
Year of birth missing (living people)
Bharatiya Janata Party politicians from Assam
Assam MLAs 2021–2026
All India United Democratic Front politicians